Walibi Holland (previously called Flevohof, Walibi Flevo, Six Flags Holland and Walibi World) is a theme park in Biddinghuizen, Netherlands.

History
The park was opened in 1971 as 'Flevohof'. It was an educational theme park themed after agriculture and farming. Having struggled to compete with more modern family attractions, Flevohof went bankrupt in 1993, and was subsequently purchased by the Walibi Group that autumn, who redeveloped the site as an amusement park. After a major winter-long programme of reconstruction the park reopened as Walibi Flevo on 7 May 1994, featuring the world's first Vekoma suspended looping coaster (SLC), El Condor. The park also adopted the wallaby mascot of its sister park, Walibi Wavre in Belgium created in 1975 by Eddy Meeùs, a Belgian businessman. (The name 'Walibi', incidentally, is derived from the first two letters of three towns in Belgium put together to form a single word: Wavre - Limal - Bierges).

The Walibi parks, including Bellewaerde in Belgium, were purchased by Premier Parks Inc. in 1998, who subsequently overhauled the Flevo park, removing the 'Walibi' branding and building thirty new attractions as part of its transformation into Six Flags Holland in 2000. Six Flags's nominal expansion into Europe saw a similar refurbishment of the Belgian Walibi theme park, which was renamed to Six Flags Belgium. Both parks benefiting from the group's rights to use Warner Brothers characters within them, leading to the creation of a Looney Tunes-themed area and a powered-launch coaster themed around popular comic figure Superman, later changed to the Xpress.

In 2004, Six Flags Holland and its sister parks were purchased by financiers Palamon Capital Partners, who grouped the attractions under the name "StarParks". The park reverted to Walibi branding in 2005; numerous attractions having been rebranded as the sale of the parks also meant the loss of any references to Looney Tunes and DC Comics characters rights.

In the second half of 2006, the parks were sold for the second time in as many years to the French group Grévin & Cie (Compagnie des Alpes), most notably the operators of the French themed resort Parc Astérix, who also purchased two other Dutch attractions - the Dolfinarium Harderwijk and Avonturenpark Hellendoorn. In 2011 the park was renamed as Walibi Holland, which introduced new mascots.

The adjacent associated event grounds were originally developed with Scouting Nederland for the EuroJam 1994 and the 18th World Scout Jamboree in 1995.  It is or has been the location of many festivals such as the Lowlands music festival and the Defqon.1 music festival.

Attractions

Present rides

Roller coasters

Thrill rides

Family rides

Water rides

Former rides / attractions

See also
 2011 in amusement parks
 Defqon.1 Festival

References

External links

 Walibi Holland Official Website
 
 Walibi Holland Fan Page (Dutch)

 
Amusement parks in the Netherlands
Compagnie des Alpes
1971 establishments in the Netherlands
Tourist attractions in Flevoland
Buildings and structures in Flevoland
Dronten
Amusement parks opened in 1971
20th-century architecture in the Netherlands